A hose is a flexible hollow tube designed to carry fluids from one location to another. Hoses are also sometimes called pipes (the word pipe usually refers to a rigid tube, whereas a hose is usually a flexible one), or more generally tubing. The shape of a hose is usually cylindrical (having a circular cross section).

Hose design is based on a combination of application and performance. Common factors are size, pressure rating, weight, length, straight hose or coilhose, and chemical compatibility.

Applications mostly use nylon, polyurethane, polyethylene, PVC, or synthetic or natural rubbers, based on the environment and pressure rating needed. In recent years, hoses can also be manufactured from special grades of polyethylene (LDPE and especially LLDPE). Other hose materials include PTFE (Teflon), stainless steel, and other metals.

Dredge rubber hoses have a long story, which features high strength and flexibility. A flexible dredging hose widely used in dredgers to convey silt or gravel. It is resistant to abrasion and wear to ensure long service life. Types of flexible dredge hose include the floating rubber hose, discharge hose, suction hose, armored hose and ceramic hose.

Reinforced rubber hose

To achieve a better pressure resistance, hoses can be reinforced with fibers or a steel cord. Commonly used reinforcement methods are braiding, spiraling, knitting and wrapping of fabric plies. The reinforcement increases the pressure resistance but also the stiffness. To obtain flexibility, corrugations or bellows are used. Usually, circumferential or helical reinforcement rings are applied to maintain these corrugated or bellowed structures under internal pressure.

Applications
Hoses can be used in water or other liquid environments, or to convey air or other gases. Hoses are used to carry fluids through air or fluid environments, and they are typically used with clamps, spigots, flanges, and nozzles to control fluid flow. 

Specific applications include the following:
 A garden hose is used to water plants in a garden or lawn, or to convey water to a sprinkler for the same purpose.
 A tough hose is used to water crops in agriculture for drip irrigation.
 A fire hose is used by firefighters to convey water to the site of a fire.
 Air hoses are used in underwater diving to carry air from a surface compressor or from air tanks. (See also snorkeling.) Industrial uses for operating flexible machinery and worktable tooling such as pneumatic screw drivers,  grinders, staplers, etc.
 Hoses have been used in air brake systems ever since the technology was invented by George Westinghouse in 1868.  This includes:
Railway air brake hoses used between locomotives and railroad cars
Truck air brake hoses used between tractors and semi-trailers
 Vacuum hoses
 Vacuum brake hoses have been used in Vacuum brake systems ever since the technology was invented in the mid-1860s.
 Vacuum cleaners often have corrugated flexible vacuum hoses to connect the cleaning head to the motor.
 In building services, metal or plastic hoses are used to move water around a building; whilst air ducts are used to move air around (see air conditioning). They can also be used to take out vibration, and thermal or settlement movement.
 Automotive hoses are used in automobiles to move fluids around for use in cooling, lubrication, and/or hydraulics.  Hoses are also used to convey pressure or vacuum signals to control circuits or gauges, as well as conveying vacuum to heating, cooling, brake, and/or locking systems.
 In chemistry and medicine, hoses (usually called tubes) are used to move liquid chemicals or gases around.
 A fuel hose carries fuel.
 In the oil industry high pressure hoses are used to move liquids under high pressures. Typical uses are for kill and choke lines, cement lines and Kelly hose. 
These are often connected to either the choke manifold, cement manifold or standpipe manifold.

In some cases, a rubber hose has been used as a weapon with which to beat somebody. This is the origin of the term rubber-hose cryptanalysis.

See also

Heated hose

References

Further reading